The Oliver Building is located at 159 N. Dearborn Street in Chicago within the Loop.

History 
It was built for the Oliver Typewriter Company from 1907-1908 by Holabird & Roche. When two floors were added in 1920, Holabird & Roche were hired for the expansion. The cast iron exterior features typewriter-related motifs. It was declared a Chicago Landmark on May 9, 1984.

The windows above the second floor are known as "Chicago windows," and are wide window panes bracketed by narrower double-hung windows. The windows also include the name of the company below the central pane.

In the 1990s, when the Oriental Theatre wanted to expand its backstage area, architect Daniel P. Coffey came up with a design plan that gutted the Oliver while preserving one-third of its original steel structure, as well as the building's Dearborn facade and a portion of its alley facade.

Notes

Commercial buildings completed in 1908
Commercial buildings on the National Register of Historic Places in Chicago
Projects by Holabird & Root
1908 establishments in Illinois
Chicago Landmarks